Testify is the seventh solo studio album by English musician Phil Collins. Released in 2002, the album debuted at No. 30 on the American Billboard 200 albums chart, which was also the album's peak position. It was also the second Phil Collins studio album where no track peaked within the American top 40 singles chart. It was also his lowest charting album in the UK, becoming his only solo effort not to reach the Top 5. However, the album achieved success in some countries of Continental Europe. It is his second album not to be co-produced by Hugh Padgham, who co-produced  Collins' most successful albums.

Despite the shortage of success the album achieved, his subsequent First Final Farewell Tour proved to be very popular.

The album was reissued as a deluxe edition on CD, vinyl and digital on 15 April 2016, including a new second disc with bonus tracks.

Production
Testify was crafted over a two-year period at Collins' home in Switzerland, and was recorded in France and Los Angeles. Most of the album's twelve tracks are derived from demos Collins made in his bedroom studio and finished off with the help of producers Rob Cavallo and James Sanger, engineer Allen Sides, guitarist Tim Pierce, and bassist Paul Bushnell. Collins worked extensively with computers during production, work that can be seen throughout the album. After Collins made Dance into the Light without any drum machine, he returned to the device for Testify.

The album begins with an up-tempo "Wake Up Call". It was based on a 16-bar doodle Collins wrote, and only began to formalise when he brought it into studio. The title track, the longest and most complex sounding song on the album, is according to Collins "one of the most direct and most personal love songs I have ever written". Another up-tempo song, "Don't Get Me Started" follows a tradition of critical statements about politics and society Collins began with "That's Just the Way It Is", "Another Day in Paradise", and "Both Sides of the Story" in his previous albums and songs such as "Tell Me Why" with Genesis.

The soulful "It's Not Too Late" refers to lost faith in dreams – "It's never too late to make your dreams come true. We all should try it". "Driving Me Crazy" is another upbeat track. Collins said the song is about the narrow path between love and dangerous obsession.

Songs such as the aforementioned "Testify" and "This Love This Heart" were inspired by Collins' then-wife, Orianne, while their first child, Nicholas, was the main inspiration for tracks "Come with Me" and "Swing Low", and "You Touch My Heart". "Come with Me" was originally a lullaby Collins sang to his daughter Lily when she was a baby when on tour in 1990, Seriously Live! and the lyrics were developed when Nicholas was born.

Collins collaborated with his longtime associate Daryl Stuermer for "The Least You Can Do", Stuermer providing the music and lead guitar and Collins the lyrics and arrangement. Stuermer also plays guitar on the next track, "Can't Stop Loving You", a cover of Leo Sayer's 1978 country hit. Collins heard the song on the radio and brought a modern feel to the country song. "I heard Leo Sayer's version of 'Can’t Stop Loving You' on vacation and I was impressed by the fantastic melody. I have attempted to breathe new life into this song and change its feel." It was the first single off the album, hitting No. 1 in the Adult Contemporary Charts. The album ends with "Thru My Eyes" and "You Touch My Heart", another song inspired by his son. ("Thru My Eyes" is not to be confused with "Look Through My Eyes", a song recorded by Collins for the Brother Bear soundtrack in 2003).

Reception

The album was panned by critics. At Metacritic, which assigns a normalised rating out of 100 to reviews from mainstream critics, the album has received an average score of 34, based on 7 reviews, making it the worst-reviewed album of 2002. The album debuted at No. 30 on the Billboard charts, which was also the album's peak position. To date, the album has peaked the lowest of his seven solo efforts. Following Dance into the Light it was the second Phil Collins studio album where no track cracked the American Top 40 singles chart.

In the United Kingdom, it peaked at No. 15, his only solo album not to make the Top 5. It was, however, a much greater success in Continental Europe.

In France, the album even peaked at No. 2 in early 2003 and remained at that position for three weeks. It became his biggest-selling album since ...But Seriously.

In Australia, it peaked at No. 96 in November 2002 on the ARIA Albums Chart.

The lead single from the album, "Can't Stop Loving You", had success on the Adult Contemporary charts and minor airplay overall. The single peaked at No. 76 on the Billboard charts while hitting No. 1 on the Adult Contemporary charts. Other singles, "Wake Up Call", "Come with Me" and "The Least You Can Do" also enjoyed their most success on the Adult Contemporary chart.

Collins said at the time that this was to be his last studio album, but has since recorded a new album entitled Going Back, a collection of covers of Motown and other soul songs. It was released on 13 September 2010. However, he has since announced that he is out of retirement and has been working on another album.

Track listing

B-sides
"Hey Now Sunshine"
"Tears of a Clown" (Re-recorded for Going Back in 2010)

Personnel 
 Phil Collins – vocals, all instruments except where noted
 James Sangar – additional programming (1-5, 8, 11)
 Jamie Muhoberac – keyboards (9, 10)
 Tim Pierce – guitars (1-11), nylon guitar (12)
 Daryl Stuermer – guitar (9, 10)
 Paul Bushnell – bass (3-10)
 Eric Rigler – Uilleann pipes (9)

Production 
 Produced by Rob Cavallo
 Engineered by Allen Sides
 Assistant Engineer – René Weis
 Pro Tools Engineering and Editing – Doug McKean
 Tracks #1-9, 11 & 12 mixed by Allen Sides
 Track #10 mixed by Tom Lord-Alge
 Mastered by Bernie Grundman at Bernie Grundman Mastering (Hollywood, California, USA).
 Photography by Lorenzo Aguis and Norman Watson
 Artwork – M4 Design

Charts

Weekly charts

Year-end charts

Certifications

External links
The Official Phil Collins Website

References

2002 albums
Phil Collins albums
Atlantic Records albums
Albums produced by Rob Cavallo
Albums produced by Phil Collins